Joe Frank Wood (May 20, 1916 – October 10, 2002) was a professional baseball pitcher. He appeared in three games in Major League Baseball for the Boston Red Sox during the 1944 season. He was born in Shohola, Pennsylvania. His father, Smoky Joe Wood, also was a major league pitcher.

In three pitching appearances, including one start, Wood posted a 0–1 record with a 6.52 ERA, 13 hits allowed, five strikeouts, three walks, and  innings of work.
 
Wood died in Old Saybrook, Connecticut, at the age of 86.

See also
List of second-generation Major League Baseball players

External links

 Retrosheet
 Interview with Joe Wood conducted by Eugene Murdock, April 19, 1975, in New Haven, Connecticut, in 2 parts: Part 1 of 2, Part 2 of 2

Major League Baseball pitchers
Boston Red Sox players
Scranton Red Sox players
Louisville Colonels (minor league) players
San Diego Padres (minor league) players
Sacramento Solons players
Fresno Cardinals players
Ada Herefords players
Seminole Oilers players
Yale Bulldogs baseball players
Baseball players from Pennsylvania
1916 births
2002 deaths
People from Pike County, Pennsylvania
People from Old Saybrook, Connecticut